Full disclosure is a "lightly moderated" security mailing list generally used for discussion about information security and disclosure of vulnerabilities. The list was created on July 9, 2002 by Len Rose and also administered by him, who later handed it off to John Cartwright. After Len Rose shut down netsys.com, the list was hosted and sponsored by Secunia.

The Full Disclosure mailing list was originally created because many people felt that the Bugtraq mailing list had "changed for the worse". 

In March 2014 Cartwright shutdown the original Full-Disclosure mailing list because an "unnamed" security researcher made requests for large-scale deletion of information and threatened legal action. Cartwright wrote on the list's homepage, "I always assumed that the turning point would be a sweeping request for large-scale deletion of information that some vendor or other had taken exception to. I never imagined that request might come from a researcher within the 'community' itself."

On March 25, 2014 the list was "rebooted" by Fyodor. The site is now part of seclists.org and no longer associated with grok.org.uk.

Notable 0-days first disclosed in Full-disclosure

References

External links
Full Disclosure mailing list
Archive

Electronic mailing lists